Nag Pipariya is a village 15 km away from Vidisha. It is in Vidisha district of Madhya Pradesh in India. It has population of 175 people. Of 175 people 79 are males and 96 are female.

References

Villages in Vidisha district